The Shipwreck is a landscape painting by J. M. W. Turner in the collection of the Tate. It was completed around 1805, when it was exhibited in Turner's own gallery. The painting is an important example of the sublime in British art.

It is thought that the picture probably records the then recent sinking of the Earl of Abergavenny, which foundered of Weymouth on 4 February 1805.

References 

Paintings by J. M. W. Turner
1805 paintings
Maritime paintings
Collection of the Tate galleries